In Motion is Joey Yung's thirteenth Cantonese full-length studio album, released on 1 September 2008.

Track listing
 跑步機上 On the Treadmill
 與蝶同眠 Sleeping with Butterflies
 夢非夢 Dream Aren't Dreams
 二人浴 Bath Together
 忘憂草 Daylily
 愛怪物的你 Monster Lover
 Scream! 
 蛇 Snake
 頹 Laziness
 28個我 '28 Me's'

Chart history

Joey Yung albums
2008 albums
Cantonese-language albums